Pennsylvania State Senate District 25 includes parts of Centre County and Jefferson County and all of Cameron County, Clinton County, Elk County, McKean County, and Potter County. It is currently represented by Republican Cris Dush.

District profile
The district includes the following areas:

All of Cameron County

Centre County

 Bellefonte
 Benner Township
 Boggs Township
 Burnside Township
 Centre Hall
 College Township
 Curtin Township
 Gregg Township
 Haines Township
 Harris Township
 Howard
 Howard Township
 Liberty Township
 Marion Township
 Miles Township
 Milesburg
 Millheim
 Penn Township
 Potter Township
 Snow Shoe
 Snow Shoe Township
 Spring Township
 State College
 Union Township
 Unionville
 Walker Township

All of Clinton County

All of Elk County,

Jefferson County

 Barnett Township
 Beaver Township
 Brockway
 Brookville
 Clover Township
 Corsica
 Eldred Township
 Falls Creek (Jefferson County portion)
 Heath Township
 Knox Township
 Pine Creek Township
 Reynoldsville
 Rose Township
 Snyder Township
 Summerville
 Sykesville
 Union Township
 Warsaw Township
 Washington Township
 Winslow Township

All of McKean County

All of Potter County

Senators

References

Pennsylvania Senate districts
Government of Cameron County, Pennsylvania
Government of Clearfield County, Pennsylvania
Government of Clinton County, Pennsylvania
Government of Elk County, Pennsylvania
Government of Jefferson County, Pennsylvania
Government of McKean County, Pennsylvania
Government of Potter County, Pennsylvania
Government of Tioga County, Pennsylvania